Goleníshchev-Kutúzov may refer to
 Arseny Golenishchev-Kutuzov (1848–1913), Russian poet
 Ilya Golenishchev-Kutuzov (1904–1969), Russian philologist, poet and translator
 Mikhail Illarionovich Golenishchev-Kutuzov (1745–1813), Russian field marshal and prince

See also
 Kutuzov (surname)
 Kutuzov (disambiguation)